The Enfield–Suffield Veterans Bridge, commonly known in either town as the Enfield Bridge or Suffield Bridge, is the main traffic crossing that connects the towns of Enfield and Suffield, Connecticut over the Connecticut River. It carries Route 190 as well as the Windsor Locks Canal State Park Trail across the river.

See also 
 List of crossings of the Connecticut River

External links and references

Bridges over the Connecticut River
Enfield, Connecticut
Suffield, Connecticut
Bridges completed in 1966
Bridges in Hartford County, Connecticut
Road bridges in Connecticut
Box girder bridges in the United States
Steel bridges in the United States